National Highway 33 (NH 33) (previously known as NH 80) is a  National Highway in India. It runs from Arwal to Farakka. It is a very important highway linking Bihar and West Bengal .This highway connects Major cities of Bihar like Munger and Bhagalpur to capital city patna.

Route

Bihar 
Arwal
Jehanabad
Bandhuganj 
Biharsharif
Barbigha
Mokama
Lakhisarai
Munger
Bariarpur 
Sultanganj
Bhagalpur
Kahalgaon
Pirpainti

Jharkhand 
Sahibganj
Rajmahal
Barharwa

West Bengal 
Farakka

Junction

  Terminal at Arwal
  near Jehanabad
  near Biharsharif
  near Barbigha
  near Mokama
  Munger
  near Bariarpur
  near Bhagalpur
  near Pirpainti
  Terminal at Farakka

References

External links
 NH 33 on OpenStreetMap

National highways in India